"The Last Amazing Grays" is the first single from Sonata Arctica's album The Days of Grays, released in Finland exclusively on August 26, 2009 via Nuclear Blast Records. It features the video edit of the song "Flag in the Ground" which is the first video from the album. The song was ranked third on the Finnish record chart.

Track listing
 "The Last Amazing Grays" (single edit) - 4:14
 "Flag in the Ground" (video edit) - 4:10
 "The Last Amazing Grays" (orchestral version) - 5:10

Personnel
Tony Kakko – vocals
Elias Viljanen – guitar
Marko Paasikoski – bass guitar
Henrik Klingenberg – keyboards
Tommy Portimo – drums

References

2009 songs
Sonata Arctica songs
Nuclear Blast Records singles